The Arafura fantail (Rhipidura dryas), sometimes known as the wood fantail, inhabits the Lesser Sunda Islands, the northern coast of Australia from the Kimberley to the western side of the Cape York Peninsula, including subcoastally in the Top End of the Northern Territory, and southern New Guinea.  It is similar to the rufous fantail, from which it has been split taxonomically but, apart from minor overlap in the eastern Moluccas, their geographic ranges are discrete.  It is generally duller than the rufous fantail with the rufous colouration more restricted.

Subspecies 
According to IOC there are 11  recognised subspecies. In taxonomic order, these are:
 R. d. celebensis	Büttikofer, 1892 - Tanahjampea and Kalao
 R. d. mimosae	Meise, 1929 - Kalaotoa 
 R. d. sumbensis	Hartert, E, 1896 - Sumba and Sawu
 R. d. semicollaris	Müller, S, 1843 - Flores east to Timor and Wetar
 R. d. elegantula	Sharpe, 1879 - eastern Lesser Sundas
 R. d. reichenowi	Finsch, 1901 - Babar Islands 
 R. d. hamadryas	Sclater, PL, 1883 - Tanimbar Islands
 R. d. squamata	Müller, S, 1843 - north-central and southwestern Moluccas, Raja Ampat and Babi islands
 R. d. henrici	Hartert, E, 1918 - Seram, Kai Islands, Aru Islands
 R. d. streptophora	Ogilvie-Grant, 1911- coastal south-central New Guinea
 R. d. dryas	Gould, 1843 - coastal northwestern and north-central Australia

Habitat
The species is typically found in mangroves and other coastal woodland, alongside primary and secondary low-level forest. The species tolerates a wide altitudinal range, from near sea level to around 2000 metres in the Timor part of its range.

Related species 

It is one of over 40 member species of the genus Rhipidura, commonly known as the fantails. Within the genus it belongs to a group of five closely related species: R. rufidorsa, R. brachyrhyncha, R. dahli, R. teysmanni and R. rufifrons. A molecular phylogeny study showed the Rufous fantail (Rhipidura rufifrons) to be its closest relative.

It forms a superspecies with R. rufifrons and R. semirubra, and all three are often considered conspecific. All are part of a larger species group that also includes R. teysmanni, R. superflua, R. dedemi, R. opistherythra, R. lepida, R. rufidorsa, R. dahli, R. matthiae and R. malaitae.

References

Arafura fantail
Birds of the Maluku Islands
Birds of the Lesser Sunda Islands
Birds of New Guinea
Birds of the Northern Territory
Arafura fantail